The Kaliningrad Regional Committee of the Communist Party of the Soviet Union, commonly referred to as the Kaliningrad CPSU obkom, was the position of highest authority in the Kaliningrad Oblast, in the Russian SFSR of the Soviet Union. The position was created on April 7, 1946, and abolished on August 23, 1991. The First Secretary was a de facto appointed position usually by the Politburo or the General Secretary himself.

List of First Secretaries of the Communist Party of Kaliningrad

See also
Kaliningrad Oblast

Notes

Footnote

Sources

Regional Committees of the Communist Party of the Soviet Union
Politics of Kaliningrad Oblast
1946 establishments in the Soviet Union
1991 disestablishments in the Soviet Union